John Joseph Burke Jr. (born January 29, 1923) is an American retired professional golfer who was most prominent in the 1950s. The son of a professional golfer, Jack Burke Sr., he won two major titles, both in 1956, the Masters and PGA Championship, and is a member of the World Golf Hall of Fame.

Burke won 16 PGA Tour events between 1950 and 1963. He won four times in 1950 and five times in 1952, including four in consecutive weeks in February and March. He had not won since 1953 when he won the 1956 Masters, coming from eight strokes behind in the final round to overtake leader Ken Venturi, an amateur, who took 80. Later in 1956 he won the PGA Championship, beating Ted Kroll 3&2 in the final. His last tour win came in 1963, just before his 40th birthday. Burke was in five successive American Ryder Cup teams from 1951 to 1959, serving as playing captain in 1957, when Great Britain won for the first time since 1933, and as the non-playing captain in 1973. He had a successful playing record, winning 7 of his 8 matches, only losing his singles match in 1957.

In 1957, Burke and Jimmy Demaret founded Champions Golf Club in Houston. The club has hosted a number of important events including the 1967 Ryder Cup and the 1969 U.S. Open.

Early life
Born in Fort Worth, Texas, Burke started playing golf at the age of seven. His father, Jack Burke Sr., was the club professional at Houston's River Oaks Country Club until his sudden death in 1943. He was a runner-up at the U.S. Open in 1920. The younger Burke graduated from St. Thomas High School in Houston in 1940. He attended Rice University in 1941. While still an amateur he qualified for the 1941 U.S. Open, the first to be played in Texas, but missed the cut. In 1942 he became the professional at Galveston Country Club. From 1942 to 1946 he served in the Marine Corps and was stationed at Marine Corps Air Station Miramar where he taught combat skills to Marines headed overseas for World War II.

Golf career
After the war, Burke resumed his golf career after first considering work in the oil fields of Texas. His first job was as a teaching pro at Hollywood Golf Club in Deal, New Jersey, which was followed by a position as an assistant at Winged Foot Golf Club, where he was mentored by Claude Harmon. From early 1948 he was the club professional at Metropolis Country Club in White Plains, New York.

In January 1949, Burke finished tied for the third place in the Long Beach Open, having led after 3 rounds. In September he won the Metropolitan Open at his home club, finishing six strokes ahead of Gene Sarazen. Burke started 1950 with a third-place finish in the Los Angeles Open. In the following days he was a joint winner in the Bing Crosby Pro-Am, one of four players who finished level. In February he won his first outright tour event, the Rio Grande Valley Open and had further wins in March and July, finishing fifth in the PGA tour money list. He didn't win in 1951 but was runner-up five times and again finished fifth in the money list. In February and March 1952 Burke won four successive tournaments in four weeks. Three of these he won by six or more strokes with the other being won in a three-way playoff. He had his fifth win of the season in December. In addition he lost two 18-hole playoffs during the year and finished second in the Masters. Burke won the Vardon Trophy for the lowest scoring average in 1952, finishing third in the money list.

Burke won a further PGA tour event in 1953 but only finished 19th in the money list. He didn't win in 1954 but he finished second in the Vardon Trophy standings and second in the money list, helped by $7,500 won for a runner-up finish in the big money World Championship of Golf. In 1955 he dropped to 15th in the money list. He reach the quarterfinals of 1955 PGA Championship, losing a nine-hour, 40-hole quarterfinal match to Cary Middlecoff.

Burke won two majors in 1956, the Masters and the PGA Championship. In his Masters victory, Burke came from eight strokes behind in the final round to overtake Ken Venturi, then an amateur. After three rounds Venturi led by four strokes from Cary Middlecoff with the rest of the field at least seven shots behind. After 8 holes of the final round Venturi had a six-stroke lead over Middlecoff and Burke. Middlecoff took a double bogey at the 17th hole, his third of the round, and finished in third place. Burke completed the last 10 holes in level par while Venturi had seven bogeys, giving Burke a one-shot victory over Venturi with Middlecoff a further shot behind. For the 1956 PGA Championship the format had been changed with 128 players competing in a pure matchplay format, players qualifying through a mixture of exemptions and sectional qualifying. Previously there had been 36 holes of strokeplay followed by matchplay for the leading 64. Burke won 7 matches, defeating Leon Pounders, Bill Collins, Fred Haas, Chandler Harper and Fred Hawkins in 18 holes matches to reach the 36-hole semi-finals. In his semi-final against Ed Furgol, Burke was 5-down after 14 holes of the morning round but recovered to win at the 37th hole, to meet Ted Kroll in the final. Kroll was 3-up after 19 holes but Burke made 5 birdies in 6 holes from the 4th hole to go 2-up and eventually won 3&2. He was selected PGA Player of the Year in 1956, finishing 5th in the money list.

After 1956 Burke had less success although he won further PGA Tour events in 1958, 1959, 1961 and 1963 bringing his total to 16 over his career. In 1958 he finished 14th in the tour money list, his best season after 1956.

Burke was in five successive American Ryder Cup teams from 1951 to 1959. He was the playing captain in 1957 and the non-playing captain in 1973. He had a successful playing record, winning his first 7 matches; two matches in 1951, 1953 and 1955, and winning in the foursomes in 1957, before losing to Peter Mills in the singles. Mills won 5 holes in a row from the 6th to the 10th to be 5 up, finished the morning round 5 ahead and eventually won the match 5&3. Great Britain won 6 of the 8 singles and halved another to win the Ryder Cup for the first time since 1933. Burke was in the 1959 Ryder Cup team but had a hand injury and was not selected for any matches.

Burke partnered with Jimmy Demaret to found Champions Golf Club in Houston in 1957. The 36-hole facility hosted a PGA Tour event from 1966 to 1971, today's Shell Houston Open. As well, the club hosted the 1967 Ryder Cup, the 1969 U.S. Open, the 1993 U.S. Amateur, and the PGA Tour Championship in 1990, 1997, 1999, 2001, and 2003. Burke was the fifth recipient of the PGA Tour Lifetime Achievement Award in 2003, and was inducted into the World Golf Hall of Fame in 2000.

Burke shares his permanent locker at Augusta National Golf Club, home of The Masters, with Tiger Woods. Both keep their green jackets, awarded to the winners of the tournament, in the locker. Burke has coached several current PGA Tour stars, including Phil Mickelson, in putting.

Personal life
Burke was first married to Ielene Lang in 1952. His second wife is Robin Moran, an amateur golfer. She was runner-up in the 1997 U.S. Women's Amateur, played in the 1998 Curtis Cup and was the captain of the American 2016 Curtis Cup team. She was inducted into the Texas Golf Hall of Fame in 2016. They run the Champions Golf Club together.

Professional wins (19)

PGA Tour wins (16)

PGA Tour playoff record (4–4)

Other wins (3)
Note: This list may be incomplete.

1949 Metropolitan Open
1958 Yomiuri Pro Championship
1967 Texas State Open

Major championships

Wins (2)

Results timeline

Note: Burke never played in The Open Championship.

CUT = missed the halfway cut
WD = withdrew
R64, R32, R16, QF, SF = Round in which player lost in PGA Championship match play
"T" indicates a tie for a place.

Source:

Summary

Most consecutive cuts made – 14 (1951 Masters – 1956 Masters)
Longest streak of top-10s – 3 (1955 U.S. Open – 1956 Masters)

U.S. national team appearances
Ryder Cup: 1951 (winners), 1953 (winners), 1955 (winners), 1957 (playing captain), 1959 (winners), 1973 (winners, non-playing captain)
Hopkins Trophy: 1952 (winners), 1953 (winners), 1955 (winners)

See also
List of golfers with most PGA Tour wins
List of longest PGA Tour win streaks

References

Further reading

External links

Jack Burke Jr. – Texas Golf Hall of Fame
Jack Burke Jr. '40 – St. Thomas High School
Story – Champions Golf Club

American male golfers
PGA Tour golfers
Winners of men's major golf championships
Ryder Cup competitors for the United States
World Golf Hall of Fame inductees
Golfers from Texas
United States Marine Corps personnel of World War II
Sportspeople from Fort Worth, Texas
St. Thomas High School (Houston, Texas) alumni
American centenarians
Men centenarians
1923 births
Living people